The 2001 Women's British Open was held 2–5 August in England at Sunningdale Golf Club, southwest of London in Sunningdale, Berkshire. It was the 25th edition of the Women's British Open, and the first as a major championship on the LPGA Tour. It replaced the du Maurier Classic in Canada as the fourth and final major of the season.

On Sunningdale's Old Course, Se-ri Pak won the third of her five major titles, two strokes ahead of runner-up Mi -Hyun Kim. Four strokes behind leader Catriona Matthew after 54 holes and tied for ninth, Pak eagled the first hole on Sunday and shot a final round  for 

The event was televised by ESPN and ABC Sports in the United States and BBC Sport in the United Kingdom.

Round summaries

First round
Thursday, 2 August 2001

Second round
Friday, 3 August 2001

Amateurs: Hudson (−3), Prieto (+6)

Third round
Saturday, 4 August 2001

Final round
Sunday, 5 August 2001

Amateur: Hudson (−3)

Source:

References

External links
Ladies European Tour: 2001 Weetabix Women's British Open results
LPGA: 2001 Women's British Open results

Women's British Open
Golf tournaments in England
British Open
Women's British Open
August 2001 sports events in the United Kingdom
2000s in Berkshire